Garudacharpalya is a locality in the eastern part of Bangalore, India. It is located along the Whitefield road (ITPL Main road). This is also Ward no 82 on the BBMP Wards list and is part of the Mahadevapura Assembly constituency. Neetish Purushotham is the present Corporater of Garudacharpalya Ward No. 82.

As per BBMP 2015 elections

Total voters: 36154 
 Male:20317  
 Female: 15823  
 Others:14

Metro Station 

As part of the Phase II extension plan of the Purple Line (Namma Metro), Garudacharpalya will also have a Metro Station.

Important spots of the locality 

 Fire Station
 ITI Industrial Estate
 Decathlon
 Phoenix Market City 
 Godrej United
 Brigade Metropolis
 Purva Parkridge
 ABB
 VST Tractors
 Goushala - This is a shelter for cows, buffaloes and even camels

References

Neighbourhoods in Bangalore